Automeris louisiana, the Louisiana eyed silkmoth, is a species of moth in the family Saturniidae. It is found in North America.

The MONA or Hodges number for Automeris louisiana is 7749.1.

ITIS Taxonomic note:
US ESA: Petition to list as threatened or endangered substantial and initiating status review according to 90-day petition finding, as published in Federal Register Volume 76, Number 187, Pages 59836 - 59862, September 27, 2011.

References

Further reading

 
 
 
 

Hemileucinae
Articles created by Qbugbot
Moths described in 1981